Climbing is a major US-based rock climbing magazine first published in 1970. In 2007, it was bought by Skram Media, the publisher of Urban Climber Magazine. The headquarters of the magazine is in Boulder, Colorado. It is published nine times a year. Climbing was purchased by Outside in 2021.

See also 
 Alpinist magazine
 Summit magazine
 Rock & Ice

References

External links

 

Online magazines published in the United States
Sports magazines published in the United States
Climbing magazines
Magazines established in 1970
Magazines published in Colorado